AD 7 was a common year starting on Saturday (link will display the full calendar) of the Julian calendar. In the Roman Empire, it was known as the Year of the Consulship of Metellus and Nerva (or, less frequently, year 760 Ab urbe condita). The denomination "AD 7" for this year has been used since the early medieval period, when the Anno Domini calendar era became the prevalent method in Europe for naming years.

Events

By place

Roman Empire 
 Illyrian tribes in Pannonia and Dalmatia continue the Great Illyrian Revolt against Roman rule.
 Publius Quinctilius Varus is appointed governor of Germania, charged with organizing Germania between the Rhine and Elbe rivers. He carries out a census, devises tributes and recruits soldiers, all of which creates dissension among the Germanic tribes.
 Abgarus of Edessa is deposed as king of Osroene.
 Construction of the Temple of Concord begins.

China 
 Zhai Yi, Governor of the Commandery of Dong (modern Puyang, Henan) declares Liu Zin, Marquess of Yang Xiang (modern Tai'an, Shandong), emperor.  This proves to be the largest of the rebellions against Emperor Ruzi of Han.
 Wang Mang puts down the rebellion during the winter. Zhai is captured and executed while Liu Xin escapes.

Persia 
 Vonones I becomes ruler of the Parthian Empire (approximate date).

Africa 
 The epoch of the Ethiopian calendar begins.

Births 
 Gnaeus Domitius Corbulo, Roman general (d. AD 67)
 Julia, daughter of Drusus Julius Caesar and Livilla (d. AD 43)

Deaths 
 Athenodoros Cananites, Stoic philosopher (b. 74 BC)
 Aulus Licinius Nerva Silianus, Roman consul
 Glaphyra, daughter of Archelaus of Cappadocia (approximate date)
 Lucius Sempronius Atratinus, Roman politician

References 

 

als:0er#Johr 7